Airese K. Currie (born November 16, 1982) is a former professional American and Canadian football wide receiver. He was drafted by the Chicago Bears in the fifth round of the 2005 NFL Draft. He played college football for the Clemson Tigers.

Currie was also a member of the BC Lions and Hamilton Tiger-Cats.

Early years
Currie attended Richland Northeast High School in Columbia, South Carolina, and was a letterman in football and track. In track, he was the South Carolina state champion on the 200 and the 400 meter dashes, and ran a personal best of 10.22 seconds on the 100 meter dash.

College career
Currie attended Clemson University and was a letterman in football and track. In track, he was a three-time All-Atlantic Coast Conference selection, and as a senior, he won the NCAA Regional East title on the 100 meter dash.

Track and field
Currie was also a track star. He was a three-time All-Atlantic Coast Conference selection, and as a senior, he won the NCAA Regional East title on the 100 meter dash, posting a time of 10.22 seconds.

In 2004, he ran anchor for the Tigers' 4 x 100 meter relay team, which was ranked as the 14th-fastest time of that season. He also ran the 60 meters and 200 meters, posting personal bests of 6.79 seconds and 20.65 seconds, respectively.

Personal bests

Professional career

2005 NFL Combine

Chicago Bears
He was selected with the fourth pick of the fifth round of the 2005 NFL Draft out of Clemson University.  He spent his entire rookie season in 2005 with the Chicago Bears on injured reserve. In the 2006 season he was again placed on injured reserve on September 29, 2006 soon after playing his first NFL game.  He was released on May 7, 2007.

Hamilton Tiger-Cats
Currie was signed by the Hamilton Tiger-Cats on April 9, 2009.

References

External links
Just Sports Stats

1982 births
Living people
American football wide receivers
BC Lions players
Chicago Bears players
Clemson Tigers football players
Clemson Tigers men's track and field athletes
Hamilton Tiger-Cats players
Players of American football from Columbia, South Carolina
Players of Canadian football from Columbia, South Carolina
Track and field athletes from South Carolina